Yelena Taranova (born 23 August 1961 in Baku) is an Azerbaijani paralympic sport shooter, silver medalist of 2000 Summer Paralympics and bronze medalist of 2004 Summer Paralympics, 2010 Volmerange-les-Mines and 2011 Columbus World Cup winner. She presented Azerbaijan on 2012 Summer Paralympics.

Yelena Taranova is the 1st in World  Ranking List in Women's 10m Air Pistol SH1 and Mixed 50m Free Pistol SH1 categories

Results
https://olympics.com/tokyo-2020/paralympic-games/en/results/shooting/athlete-profile-n1286028-taranova-yelena.htm

Paralympic Games

2	Mixed Free Pistol SH1	2000	Sydney, NSW, AUS	622.7

3	Women's Air Pistol SH1	2004	Athens, GRE	457.3

4	P2 - Women's 10m Air Pistol SH1	2016	Rio de Janeiro, BRA	148.8

6	Women's Air Pistol SH1	2008	Beijing, CHN	460.1

7	P2 - Women's 10m Air Pistol SH1	2012	London, GBR	465.9

7	Women's Air Pistol SH1	2000	Sydney, NSW, AUS	454.2

13	P3 - Mixed 25m Pistol SH1	2016	Rio de Janeiro, BRA	560

13	Mixed Free Pistol SH1	2004	Athens, GRE	517

16	Mixed Free Pistol SH1	2008	Beijing, CHN	517

20	P4 - Mixed 50m Pistol SH1	2012	London, GBR	513

25	Mixed Sport Pistol SH1	2008	Beijing, CHN	527

27	P4 - Mixed 50m Pistol SH1	2016	Rio de Janeiro, BRA	503

DNS	P3 - Mixed 25m Pistol SH1	2012	London, GBR	DNS

World Championships

3	Mixed P4 - 50m Pistol SH1 - Team	2014	Suhl, GER	1532

5	P2 - Women's 10m Air Pistol SH1	2006	Sargans, SUI	456.9

8	P2 - Women's 10m Air Pistol SH1	2010	Zagreb, CRO	453.2

14	P2 - Women's 10m Air Pistol SH1	2014	Suhl, GER	357

17	P2 - Women's 10m Air Pistol SH1	2019	Sydney, NSW, AUS	543

20	P3 - Mixed 25m Pistol SH1	2019	Sydney, NSW, AUS	557

24	P3 - Mixed 25m Pistol SH1	2018	Cheongju, KOR	539

24	P3 - Mixed 25m Pistol SH1	2006	Sargans, SUI	

26	P2 - Women's 10m Air Pistol SH1	2018	Cheongju, KOR	526

26	P4 - Mixed 50m Pistol SH1	2014	Suhl, GER	506

39	P4 - Mixed 50m Pistol SH1	2019	Sydney, NSW, AUS	500

40	P4 - Mixed 50m Pistol SH1	2010	Zagreb, CRO

Education
Azerbaijan State Oil and Industry University, Baku, AZE

Languages spoken:Russian

Coach: Akbar Muradov [national], AZE

Start: 1999 in Baku, Azerbaijan.

Sources 

1961 births
Living people
Azerbaijani female sport shooters
Paralympic shooters of Azerbaijan
Paralympic silver medalists for Azerbaijan
Paralympic bronze medalists for Azerbaijan
Paralympic medalists in shooting
Shooters at the 2000 Summer Paralympics
Shooters at the 2004 Summer Paralympics
Shooters at the 2008 Summer Paralympics
Shooters at the 2012 Summer Paralympics
Medalists at the 2000 Summer Paralympics
Medalists at the 2004 Summer Paralympics
Shooters at the 2020 Summer Paralympics
21st-century Azerbaijani women